The Hanover is the wreck of a schooner located off the coast of Fish Creek, Wisconsin.

History
The Hanover was built in 1853. It hauled bulk cargo, primarily grain, across the upper Great Lakes. The vessel struck a shoal near the Strawberry Islands in November 1867. As a result, it was stripped and abandoned.

In 2014, the shipwreck was re-discovered. The following year, it was added to the State and the National Register of Historic Places.

References

Shipwrecks on the National Register of Historic Places in Wisconsin
National Register of Historic Places in Door County, Wisconsin
Shipwrecks of the Wisconsin coast
Shipwrecks of Lake Michigan